Welsh Italians are an ethnic minority of Italian or mixed Italian and Welsh descent living in Wales. Most Italian immigration to Wales took place in the 19th and early 20th centuries, with the largest number of migrants settling in Glamorgan and Newport.

Migration history

Italian immigrants to Wales, mainly originating from the Apennine Mountains and in particular the town of Bardi, established a network of cafés, ice cream parlours and fish and chip shops in Wales from the 1890s onwards. In the Rhondda Valley the cafés became known as "Bracchis" after an early café owner. The number of Italian cafés in Wales was more than 300 before World War Two. 11 of these are still run by the same families. The brothers Frank and Aldo Berni, who started in business in Merthyr Tydfil, went on to found the Berni Inn chain. Ystrad Mynach has seen many Italian cafes over the years, owned by families such as Lusardi, Massari, Bracchi and Sidoli. The last Italian cafe in the town, John's Cafe, was owned by the Sidoli family and closed in 2017 after over 50 years of trading. 

During the Second World War, Welsh Italians without British citizenship were declared enemy aliens and a number were interned on the Isle of Man or in Canada. 53 Welsh Italians lost their lives in the sinking of the passenger ship  in 1940. A memorial was placed in Cardiff Metropolitan Cathedral in 2010 to commemorate the tragedy. A memorial chapel is in the cemetery in Bardi.

Notable people
 Boxer Joe Calzaghe
 Member of Parliament for Gower, Tonia Antoniazzi
 Actor Victor Spinetti and his brother Henry
 Boxer Enzo Maccarinelli
 Musician Pino Palladino
 Footballers David D'Auria and Donato Nardiello
 Rugby players Robert and Peter Sidoli, Theo Bevacqua, Ben Cambriani, Mark Perego, James Ratti
 Artist Andrew Vicari
 Chef Michael Bonacini

In popular culture
The BBC broadcast a two part documentary about Welsh-Italians. It was presented by Michela Chiappa (Welsh, born in Merthyr Tydfil, but of Italian parents) who went to visit Bardi. Café owner Bella Lasagne from Fireman Sam is an Italian citizen living in Wales.

See also
Italians in the United Kingdom

References

External links
Amici Val Ceno Galles Welsh Italian friendship society 
A South Wales male voice choir visit Bardi
BBC Wales feature on Italian immigration to Wales
Articles and information about Welsh Italians

Italian diaspora in the United Kingdom
Ethnic groups in Wales